Jane Velez-Mitchell is a television and social media journalist and author, with specialities in vegan lifestyles, animal rights, addiction and social justice.

Early life and career
Velez-Mitchell was born to a Puerto Rican mother and an Irish American father. In early 1990, Velez-Mitchell was a co-anchor alongside Jerry Dunphy on the debut of a three-hour news broadcast on KCAL-TV, a local Los Angeles TV station.  She would also make anchor appearances on KCAL-TV sister station KCBS-TV. Other hosting duties included talk radio KABC (AM), Los Angeles.

Current career
She is the founder of #JaneUnChained, a digital news network for animal rights and the vegan lifestyle which uses more than 60 volunteer contributors from around the world to showcase vegan festivals, animal rights conferences, organizations, vegan restaurants and cooking. The videos originate on the Velez-Mitchell's Facebook page, which has 16.5 million video views in 2017. The network is a 501 c (3) non profit based in Marina del Rey, California.  In 2019, JaneUnChained (in conjunction with Eamonn McCrystal's "Inspired.") launched "New Day New Chef", a vegan cooking series for Amazon Prime Video. also that year JaneUnChained released its first documentary "Countdown to Year Zero" featuring Dr. Sailesh Rao.

For six years she hosted her own show on HLN, Jane Velez-Mitchell (formerly known as Issues with Jane Velez-Mitchell) replacing Glenn Beck, who moved to Fox News Channel. She is often seen commenting on high-profile cases for CNN, TruTV, E! and other national cable TV shows. Velez-Mitchell frequently guest hosts for Nancy Grace on her Headline News show. Velez-Mitchell reported for the nationally syndicated show Celebrity Justice (produced by corporate sibling Telepictures).  She also appears as a substitute host on HLN's Showbiz Tonight. In October 2014, HLN's Jane Velez-Mitchell show was cancelled.

While covering a story regarding sororities on her television show Issues with Jane Velez-Mitchell (retitled in February 2012 as simply Jane Velez-Mitchell), she stated that she attended New York University. She was in the courtroom during the entire child sexual abuse trial against singer Michael Jackson. During the trial, Velez-Mitchell appeared daily on Nancy Grace. She was featured on CNN's Larry King Live on several occasions, including on the evening of the verdict.  In November 2014, she founded JaneUnchained, a social media news outlet that focuses on social justice.

Books
Velez-Mitchell wrote the non-fiction Secrets Can Be Murder: What America’s Most Sensational Crimes Tell Us About Ourselves, in 2007. The book's premise is that by studying the secrecy and deceit embedded in more than twenty widely covered murder cases in these tragic scenarios that we can learn to opt for honesty in our own lives and avoid similar outcomes.

In September 2009, Velez-Mitchell released her memoir on addiction recovery, iWant: My Journey from Addiction and Overconsumption to a Simpler, Honest Life.

In February 2011, Velez-Mitchell released a third book, titled Addict Nation: an Intervention for America. This book examines what Velez-Mitchell believes to be growing levels of addiction in the United States to both illegal drugs and to legal phenomena like the Internet, prescription drugs, and fast food.

Velez-Mitchell' fourth book, Exposed: The Secret Life of Jodi Arias, was released in August 2013 and debuted at #5 on the New York Times Bestseller list. The book examines the life  of Jodi Arias, leading up to her murder of her ex-boyfriend, and the ensuing murder trial.

Personal life
Velez-Mitchell is openly lesbian.  She came out on Al Rantel's radio show on KABC-AM in Los Angeles in 2007.  She also has dedicated her time and resources to various charitable and humane causes. She is well known for her animal rights advocacy and is a vegan and an environmentalist.

Awards
In July 2009, Farm Animal Rights Movement awarded Velez-Mitchell the Celebrity Animal Activist Award at the Animal Rights 2009 National Conference held in Los Angeles, California. While working at Celebrity Justice, Velez-Mitchell’s reporting on animal cruelty earned that show two Genesis Awards from the Humane Society of the United States. She earned an additional Genesis Award for her show "Issues" in 2010 and the same year the VegNews magazine named her Media Maven of the Year. In 2013, Mercy for Animals awarded her their Compassionate Leadership Award. In 2014, she was honored for fighting animal abuse by the Animal Legal Defense Fund. In 2015, she received the Nanci Alexander Award at PETA's 35th anniversary celebration.

In January 2010, she was awarded the Ruby Award by Soroptimist International for her "War on Women" coverage on her television show.

See also
 List of animal rights advocates

References

External links

Jane Unchained News Network official website
Jane Unchained on VoiceAmerica live internet talk radio station.
Jane Velez-Mitchell on the Internet Movie Database

Jane Velez-Mitchell on Dr. Phil in October 2009 talks about being a midlife lesbian

1956 births
American animal rights activists
American people of Puerto Rican descent
American reporters and correspondents
American television journalists
American LGBT broadcasters
American LGBT journalists
Living people
Television anchors from Los Angeles
Television anchors from New York City
Puerto Rican journalists
LGBT Hispanic and Latino American people
American lesbian writers
American environmentalists
American veganism activists
American women environmentalists
New York University alumni
American people of Irish descent
American women television journalists